is a railway station in Nagasaki, Nagasaki Prefecture, Japan. It is operated by JR Kyushu and is on the Nagasaki Main Line.

Lines
Only local trains run on this branch.

Station layout 
The station consists of a side platform serving a single track at grade. There is no station building. A small shed on the platform houses a ticket window which is, however, now unstaffed. An automatic ticket vending machine and a weather shelter are provided.

Adjacent stations

History
Japanese National Railways (JNR) opened the station as a temporary stop on 9 March 1987. With the privatization of JNR on 1 April 1987, JR Kyushu took over control of the facility and upgraded it to a full passenger station.

Passenger statistics
In fiscal 2016, the station was used by an average of 728 passengers daily (boarding passengers only), and it ranked 201st  among the busiest stations of JR Kyushu.

Environs
Nagasaki University – 20 minutes on foot
Nagasaki Electric Tramway: Sumiyoshi tram stop
Lawson Nagasaki Nakazono store
Joyful Sun Sumiyoshi store
Chitosepia shopping complex
Nagasaki City Hall Nishi-Urakami Branch
Nagasaki City Kita Community Center
Nagasaki Sumiyoshi Post Office
Daiei Chitosepia store

References

External links
Nishi-Urakami Station (JR Kyushu)

Railway stations in Nagasaki Prefecture
Nagasaki Main Line
Railway stations in Japan opened in 1987